House of Siri Sanga Bo was a powerful dynasty which ruled parts of Sri Lanka from Vijayabahu III of Dambadeniya (1220–1224) until Rajasinha I of Sitawaka (1581–1591). Vijayabahu III of Dambadeniya routed Kalinga Magha's armies from Maya Rata and established his fortress at Dambadeniya. This dynasty was able to protect their independence by facing so many foreign invasions thereafter. They had to change their capital city to Dambadeniya, Yapahuwa and Kurunagala because of continuous invasions from southern India.

Rise of Dambadeniya 
In the reign of Kalinga Magha, native Sinhala people moved to south and Maya Rata because of his remorseless governance in Kingdom of Polonnaruwa. Meanwhile, this reign, a descendant of King Sirisangabo called "Vijayabahu III", fought against Kalinga Magha's armies and became the king of Dambadeniya. He obtained Lord Buddha's tooth relic and alms chalice to Dambadeniya from the place which Magha's people had buried them in Kotmale. He helped to reconstruct the destroyed Buddhist dispensation. He was the founder of the House of Siri Sanga Bo.

The decline of the Kingdom of Sitawaka 
The Last King of this dynasty was Rajasinha I of Sitawaka. He was a warrior and a great king of Sitawaka. He was also the son of Mayadunne. Later, he designated a South Indian, called "Aritta Kivendu" (Mannamperuma Mohottala) as his chief advisor. Kivendu influenced him to be converted to Hinduism. Rajasinha was advised by Kivendu to destroy significant Buddhist sites such as Sigiriya and Sri pada. These attacks caused to a discontent among Buddhist people and prelates about the king. It was one of the main reasons of the decline of the Kingdom of Sitawaka and House of Siri Sanga Bo. Because of his actions Buddhists led a rebellion against Rajasinha. He suppressed the rebellion and the leaders who supported the rebellion were caught. Most of them were Buddhist prelates. Over hundreds of Buddhist monks (with the chief prelate of Sitawaka) were killed by Rajasinha. These acts created a huge resentment among the Buddhists and the King.

After the annexation of Kandy, Rajasinha killed "Weerasundara Bandara", his agent (Samantha) of Kandy. Weerasundara Bandara's son escaped to Portuguese army in Mannar from Sitawaka. His name was Konappu Bandara. Later, he returned to Kandy and rebelled against Rajasinha with the help of Portuguese army. He captured Kandy from Rajasinha and became the King of Kandy. Even though, Rajasinha didn't stop his attempts to recapture Kandy. The last attempt of Rajasinha (Battle of Balana) was defeated by Konappu Bandara. While he was returning from Balana, he was wounded by a pointed bamboo segment and died at the garden of Pethangoda in March 1592. Rajasinha had no heirs to the throne of Sitawaka. His kingdom was sacked by Konappu Bandara (Vimaladharmasuriya I of Kandy) and the Portuguese.

Monarchs of House of Siri Sanga Bo

Kingdom of Dambadeniya (1220–1345)

Kingdom of Gampola (1345–1412)

Kingdom of Kotte (1412–1597)

Kingdom of Sitawaka (1521–1593)

See also 
Vijayabahu III of Dambadeniya
Kingdom of Dambadeniya
Rajasinha I of Sitawaka
Sitawaka
Battle of Balana
Vimaladharmasuriya I of Kandy

References 

 
Sinhalese royal houses
1220 establishments in Asia
1220s establishments in Asia
13th-century establishments in Sri Lanka
1597 disestablishments in Asia
1590s disestablishments in Asia
16th-century disestablishments in Sri Lanka